The Dubai Millennium Stakes, is a horse race for horses aged four and over, run at a distance of 2,000 metres (ten furlongs) on turf in February at Meydan Racecourse in Dubai.

The Dubai Millennium Stakes was first contested in 2014 as a Listed race before being elevated to Group 3 class in 2016. It is named in honour of the racehorse Dubai Millennium.

Records
Record time:
 2:00.33 – Ghaiyyath 2020

Most successful horse:
 no horse has won this race more than once

Most wins by a jockey:
 5 – William Buick 2016, 2018, 2020, 2021, 2023

Most wins by a trainer:
 7 – Charlie Appleby 2016, 2018, 2019, 2020, 2021, 2022, 2023

Most wins by an owner:
 9 – Godolphin 2014, 2015, 2016, 2018, 2019, 2020, 2021, 2022, 2023

Winners

See also
 List of United Arab Emirates horse races

References

Horse races in the United Arab Emirates
Recurring sporting events established in 2014
2014 establishments in the United Arab Emirates